Banana Yaya (born 29 July 1991) is a Cameroonian professional footballer who plays as a defender.

Career
In June 2009, Yaya signed with Tunisian club Espérance Sportive de Tunis where he started his professional playing career. 
After rumours linking him with English Championship giants Leeds United Banana signed for FC Sochaux-Montbéliard from Espérance Tunis on 17 January 2012.

Yaya was sent on loan to Swiss club Lausanne-Sport for the 2013–14 season.

On 30 July 2014, he signed for Greek Super League side Platanias for an undisclosed fee. He immediately became the undisputed leader of the club's defense.

On 23 June 2017, after the end of his contract with Platanias, he joined Olympiacos, remaining in the Super League. On the same day he was loaned to Panionios on a season-long loan, as he was not in the plans of Olympiacos coach. His loan was extended for another year.

On 4 December 2019, his contract with Olympiacos was terminated without making a single appearance for the club.

On 1 February 2022, it was announced that Bengaluru FC signed Yaya on a short-term deal for the remainder of the 2021–22 Indian Super League season.

International career
Yaya made his debut for Cameroon starting against Thailand in a friendly match in March 2015.

Career statistics

International

International goals
Scores and results list Cameroon's goal tally first.

Honours

Individual
CAF Team of the Year: 2011

References

External links

1991 births
Living people
People from Maroua
Association football central defenders
Association football midfielders
Cameroonian footballers
Cameroonian expatriate footballers
Expatriate footballers in Tunisia
Espérance Sportive de Tunis players
FC Sochaux-Montbéliard players
FC Lausanne-Sport players
Platanias F.C. players
Panionios F.C. players
Olympiacos F.C. players
Shabab Al-Ordon Club players
Ligue 1 players
Swiss Super League players
Super League Greece players
Jordanian Pro League players
2019 Africa Cup of Nations players
Expatriate footballers in France
Expatriate footballers in Switzerland
Expatriate footballers in Greece
Expatriate footballers in Jordan
Cameroon under-20 international footballers
Cameroon international footballers
Cameroonian expatriate sportspeople in Tunisia
Cameroonian expatriate sportspeople in France
Cameroonian expatriate sportspeople in Switzerland
Cameroonian expatriate sportspeople in Greece
Bengaluru FC players
Cameroonian expatriate sportspeople in Jordan
French expatriate sportspeople in Jordan
Cameroonian expatriate sportspeople in India
Expatriate footballers in India
Indian Super League players